Zacorisca seramica is a species of moth of the family Tortricidae first described by Józef Razowski in 2013. It is found on Seram Island in Indonesia. The habitat consists of lower montane forests.

The wingspan is about 30 mm. The forewings are snow white, suffused with rust red at the termen. The remaining area is black. The hindwings are rust brown, but brown to the middle and anally and sprinkled with white across the postmedian area.

Etymology
The specific name refers to Seram Island.

References

Moths described in 2013
Zacorisca